Tetiana Vasylivna Skrypka (née Riabukha; born 31 December 1984) is a Ukrainian politician currently serving as a People's Deputy of Ukraine from Ukraine's 157th electoral district since 29 August 2019. She is a member of Servant of the People.

Early life and career 
Tetiana Vasylivna Riabukha was born on 31 December 1984 in the city of Sumy, in northern Ukraine. She is currently studying administrative management since 2018.

Prior to her election, Skrypka was a teacher of primary classes in Sumy's Specialised Grade School No. 10 for Grades 1-3. She was also director of health camps "Zorianyi" KP and "Shliakhrembud" SMR.

Political career 
During the 2019 Ukrainian presidential election, Skrypka was part of Volodymyr Zelenskyy's campaign.

Skrypka was a successful candidate in the 2019 Ukrainian parliamentary election, running for the position of People's Deputy of Ukraine in Ukraine's 157th electoral district as the candidate of Servant of the People. At the time of the election, she was an independent living in Sumy. In the Verkhovna Rada (Ukraine's parliament), she joined the Verkhovna Rada Humanitarian and Informational Policy Committee, becoming head of the Subcommittee on Family and Children.

Skrypka was a candidate for mayor of Sumy in the 2020 Ukrainian local elections.

References 

Living people
Ninth convocation members of the Verkhovna Rada
Politicians from Sumy
Servant of the People (political party) politicians
Ukrainian educators
Ukrainian women educators
Women members of the Verkhovna Rada
1984 births